Berosus trilobus is a species of hydrophilid beetles from the Dominican Republic and Cuba.

References

Hydrophilinae
Beetles described in 1863